Ricardo Menéndez (born 4 September 1929, date of death unknown) was a Salvadoran sports shooter. He competed in the 50 metre rifle, prone event at the 1968 Summer Olympics.

References

1929 births
Year of death missing
Salvadoran male sport shooters
Olympic shooters of El Salvador
Shooters at the 1968 Summer Olympics
Sportspeople from San Salvador